Events from the year 1863 in Russia.

Incumbents
 Monarch – Alexander II

Events

 Apraksin Dvor
 Pavel Military School
 Vremya (magazine)
Tolstoy took five years (1863–1869) to complete his epic.

Births

Grand Duke George Mikhailovich of Russia (1863–1919)
Charles Michael, Duke of Mecklenburg, heir presumptive to the Grand Duchy of Mecklenburg-Strelitz
Nestor Kotlyarevsky, author, literary critic
Sergei Nikolaevich Trubetskoy, religious philosopher
Konstantin Alekseevich Satunin, zoologist
Aleksandr Golovin (artist)
Konstantin Stanislavski, Russian theatre practitioner 
Basil Belavin was born in 1865.

Deaths

Nikolai Turczaninow, botanist
Mikhail Shchepkin, actor
Matvey Dmitriev-Mamonov, Major-General
 Jekaterina Saltykov, courtier  (born 1791)

References

1863 in Russia
Years of the 19th century in the Russian Empire